Vision 1 FM is a privately owned radio station in Accra, the capital of Ghana. The radio station is known for its Christian based programs and donations to the needy.

References 

Radio stations in Ghana
Greater Accra Region
Mass media in Accra